Walter Herok [Herot] was a cleric from 13th century and 14th century Scotland. He served as Dean of Moray from 1296 or before until 1329. In that year, after the death of Henry le Chen, he was elected Bishop of Aberdeen. Walter travelled to Avignon to receive consecration from Pope John XXII, but died there, apparently before receiving consecration. Alexander de Kininmund became bishop instead.

References
 Dowden, John, The Bishops of Scotland, ed. J. Maitland Thomson, (Glasgow, 1912)
 Watt, D.E.R., Fasti Ecclesiae Scoticanae Medii Aevi ad annum 1638, 2nd Draft, (St Andrews, 1969)

13th-century births
1329 deaths
Bishops of Aberdeen
14th-century Scottish Roman Catholic bishops